Geitastrand is a former municipality in the old Sør-Trøndelag county in Norway. The  municipality existed from 1905 until 1963 in what is now part of the municipality of Orkland in Trøndelag county. It encompassed the coastal area along the Trondheimsfjord between the town of Orkanger in the south to the Ingdalen valley in the north. The district was thinly populated, and has no significant urban areas. The administrative centre of the municipality was at Geitastrand village where the Geitastrand Church is located. The Byneset area of the city of Trondheim is located across the fjord to the east from Geitastrand.

History

The municipality of Geitastrand was established on 1 January 1905 when it was separated from the municipality of Børsa. Initially, Geitastrand had a population of 674. During the 1960s, there were many municipal mergers across Norway due to the work of the Schei Committee. On 1 January 1963, Geitastrand was merged with the municipalities of Orkanger, Orkdal, and Orkland to form a new, larger municipality of Orkdal. Before the merger, Geitastrand had 559 inhabitants.

Name
The municipality is named  after the old name for the area along the west shore of the Orkdalsfjorden. The name comes from the old Geita farm which is located at the headland where the Orkdalsfjorden and Trondheimsfjorden meet. The last element comes from the word  which means "shoreline".

Government
During its existence, this municipality was governed by a municipal council of elected representatives, which in turn elected a mayor.

Mayors
The mayors of Geitastrand:

 1905–1910: John Wormdal (H)
 1911–1931: Ludvig Meland (V)
 1932–1937: Elling Kvernmo (Bp)
 1938–1941: Ola Bjørnbet (Bp)
 1942-1942: Emil Carlsen (NS)
 1942–1945: Nils Johnsen Kvernmo (NS)
 1946–1947: Ola Bjørnbet (Bp)
 1948–1951: Reidar Kvernmo (Bp)
 1952–1955: Ola Bjørnbet (Bp)
 1956–1959: Reidar Kvernmo (Bp)
 1960–1962: Bengt Haugness (Bp)

Municipal council
The municipal council  of Geitastrand was made up of 13 representatives that were elected to four year terms. The party breakdown of the final municipal council was as follows:

See also
List of former municipalities of Norway

References

Orkland
Former municipalities of Norway
1905 establishments in Norway
1963 disestablishments in Norway